Azerbaijan first participated at the Olympic Games as an independent nation in 1996, and has sent athletes to compete in every Games since then. Previously, Azerbaijani athletes competed as part of the Soviet Union at the Olympics from 1952 to 1988, and after the dissolution of the Soviet Union, Azerbaijan was part of the Unified Team in 1992. Azerbaijani athletes have won a total of 42 medals at the Summer Olympic Games. The nation has not won any medals at the Winter Olympic Games. The National Olympic Committee of the Azerbaijani Republic was created in 1992 and recognized by the International Olympic Committee in 1993.

In 2016, Azerbaijan became one of only two nations (the other being Great Britain, also between 2000 and 2016) ever to increase the number of medals achieved in five consecutive Games. Azerbaijan's success at the 2016 Games was driven by primarily by naturalized citizens; 12 out of the 16 medalists for Azerbaijan were born outside of the country (primarily immigrants from Russia, Ukraine, Belarus and Iran). Azerbaijan is particularly strong in contact sports, with 40 of their 45 medals being awarded in Wrestling, Boxing, Judo and Taekwondo.

Medals

Medals by Summer Games

Medals by Winter Games

Medals by Summer Sport

Medalists

Disqualified Medalists

Participants by sport

Summer Games

Winter Games

Flagbearers

See also
 National Olympic Committee of Azerbaijan
 Olympic competitors for Azerbaijan
 Azerbaijan at the Paralympics
 List of Azerbaijani Olympic medalists
 List of flag bearers for Azerbaijan at the Olympics

References

External links
 
 
 
 "Azerbaijani Wrestler Namig Abdullayev Wins Olympic Gold," in Azerbaijan International, Vol. 8:4 (Winter 2000), p. 76.
 "Zemfira Meftahatdinova: Right on Target, Olympic Gold, Skeet Shooter," in Azerbaijan International, Vol. 8:4 (Winter 2000), p. 79.
 "Vugar Alakbarov, Olympic Bronze in Boxing," in Azerbaijan International, Vol. 8:4 (Winter 2000), p. 78.

 
Olympics